Muhyiddin was the fourteenth Sultan of Brunei. He ruled from 1673 to 1690 and was succeeded by Nasruddin. He took the throne during the Brunei Civil War  to avenge the death of his father-in-law Muhammad Ali. He was widely remembered for being the Sultan who ordered the creation of Salasilah Raja-Raja Brunei.

See also
 List of Sultans of Brunei

References

1690 deaths
17th-century Sultans of Brunei
Year of birth unknown